Thromidia gigas is a species of starfish in the family Mithrodiidae in the order Valvatida discovered by Mortensen in 1935.  It lives off the coast of eastern South Africa and southern Madagascar.  This species is probably the largest echinoderm in terms of bulk, and may exceed 13 lbs.

Reference 

Mithrodiidae